Tôn Thất (Ton That or Ton-That, often simplified to Tonthat in English-language text) is a two-character Vietnamese compound surname, originating from the Nguyễn dynasty. This surname was originally Tông Thất, which is derived from a Sino-Vietnamese word, meaning "clan members" or "royal family members". The surname was changed to Tôn Thất after Thiệu Trị became the emperor due to naming taboo (Nguyễn Phúc Miên Tông).

Tôn Thất (Tôn Nữ for females): Surname for members of the Nguyễn imperial family that were not direct first born descendants of the Emperor, and therefore collateral relatives of the Nguyen dynasty.

Notable people
Tôn Thất Đính, Army of the Republic of Vietnam general
Tôn Thất Xứng, Army of the Republic of Vietnam general
Tôn Thất Thuyết (1839–1913), Nguyễn Dynasty regent
Tôn Thất Đính (mandarin), father of Tôn Thất Thuyết
Tôn-Thất Tiết (born 1933), music composer
Tôn Thất Thiện (born 1924), Vietnamese nationalist
Hoan Ton-That, Vietnamese-Australian programmer/entrepreneur
Tôn Nữ Thị Ninh, Vietnamese diplomat and educator

See also
Nguyễn
Nguyễn dynasty

Vietnamese-language surnames